Tonight at Twelve is a 1929 American drama film directed by Harry A. Pollard and written by Matt Taylor, Harry A. Pollard and Owen Davis. It is based on the 1928 play Tonight at 12 by Owen Davis. The film stars Madge Bellamy, Robert Ellis, Margaret Livingston, Vera Reynolds, Norman Trevor and Hallam Cooley. The film was released on September 29, 1929, by Universal Pictures.

Cast        
Madge Bellamy as Jane Eldridge
Robert Ellis as Jack Keith
Margaret Livingston as Nan Stoddard
Vera Reynolds as Barbara Warren
Norman Trevor as Prof. Eldridge
Hallam Cooley as Bill Warren
Mary Doran as Mary
George J. Lewis as Tony Keith 
Madeline Seymour as Alice Keith
Josephine Brown as Dora Eldridge
Don Douglas as Tom Stoddard
Louise Carver as Ellen
Nick Thompson as Joe

References

External links
 

1929 films
1920s English-language films
1929 drama films
Universal Pictures films
Films directed by Harry A. Pollard
American black-and-white films
1920s American films